The following is the list of squads that took place in the baseball tournament at the 2000 Summer Olympics.

Australia
Craig Anderson 
Grant Balfour 
Tom Becker 
Shayne Bennett 
Mathew Buckley 
Adam Burton 
Clayton Byrne 
Mark Ettles 
Paul Gonzalez 
Mark Hutton 
Ronny Johnson 
Grant McDonald 
Adrian Meagher 
Michael Moyle 
Michael Nakamura 
Dave Nilsson 
Glenn Reeves 
Brett Roneberg 
Chris Snelling 
Brad Thomas 
Rodney Van Buizen 
David White 
Gary White 
Glenn Williams

Cuba
Omar Ajete 
Yosvany Aragón 
Miguel Caldés 
Daniel Castro 
José Contreras 
Yobal Dueñas 
Yasser Gómez 
José Ibar 
Orestes Kindelán 
Pedro Luis Lazo 
Omar Linares 
Óscar Macías 
Juan Manrique 
Javier Méndez 
Rolando Meriño 
Germán Mesa 
Antonio Pacheco 
Ariel Pestano 
Gabriel Pierre 
Maels Rodríguez 
Antonio Scull 
Luis Ulacia 
Lázaro Valle 
Norge Luis Vera

Italy
Matteo Baldacci 
Fabio Betto 
Roberto Cabalisti 
Luigi Carrozza 
Francesco Casolari 
Marc Cerbone 
Alberto D'Auria 
Davide Dallospedale 
Roberto De Franceschi 
Daniele Di Pace 
Andrea Evangelisti 
Daniele Frignani 
Emiliano Ginanneschi 
Seth La Fera 
Stefano Landuzzi 
Christopher Madonna 
Claudio Liverziani 
Christian Mura 
Daniel Newman 
Battista Perri 
Diego Ricci 
David Sheldon 
Jason Simontacchi 
Michele Toriaco

Japan
Shinnosuke Abe 
Norihiro Akahoshi 
Yoshikazu Doi 
Jun Heima 
Jun Hirose 
Tomohiro Iizuka 
Masanori Ishikawa 
Yoshihiko Kajiyama 
Masato Kawano 
Tomohiro Kuroki 
Nobuhiko Matsunaka 
Daisuke Matsuzaka 
Norihiro Nakamura 
Kosuke Noda 
Osamu Nogami 
Yoshinori Okihara 
Toshiya Sugiuchi 
Masanori Sugiura 
Fumihiro Suzuki 
So Taguchi 
Yukio Tanaka 
Shunsuke Watanabe 
Akichika Yamada 
Yuji Yoshimi

Netherlands
Evert-Jan 't Hoen 
Sharnol Adriana 
Johnny Balentina 
Patrick Beljaards 
Ken Brauckmiller 
Rob Cordemans 
Jeffrey Cranston 
Mike Crouwel 
Patrick de Lange 
Radhames Dijkhoff 
Robert Eenhoorn 
Rikkert Faneyte 
Chairon Isenia 
Percy Isenia 
Eelco Jansen 
Ferenc Jongejan 
Reily Legito 
Jurriaan Lobbezoo 
Remy Maduro 
Hensley Meulens 
Ralph Milliard 
Erik Remmerswaal 
Orlando Stewart 
Dirk van 't Klooster

South Africa
Neil Adonis 
Clint Alfino 
Francisco Alfino 
Paul Bell 
Vaughn Berriman 
Jason Cook 
Errol Davis 
Simon de la Rey 
Nick Dempsey 
Ashley Dove 
Darryl Gonsalves 
Brian Harrell 
Richard Harrell 
Tim Harrell 
Ian Holness 
Kevin Johnson 
Willem Kemp 
Morne MacKay 
Liall Mauritz 
Carl Michaels 
Glen Morris 
Alan Phillips 
Darryn Smith 
Russell van Niekerk

South Korea
Jang Sung-ho
Chong Tae-hyon
Chung Min-tae
Jung Soo-keun
Hong Sung-heon
Jin Pil-jung
Kim Dong-joo
Kim Han-soo
Kim Ki-tae
Kim Soo-kyung
Kim Tae-gyun
Koo Dae-sung
Lee Byung-kyu
Lee Seung-ho
Lee Seung-yeop
Lim Chang-yong
Lim Sun-dong
Park Jae-hong
Park Jin-man
Park Jong-ho
Park Kyung-oan
Park Seok-jin
Son Min-han
Song Jin-woo

United States
Brent Abernathy
Kurt Ainsworth 
Pat Borders 
Sean Burroughs 
John Cotton 
Travis Dawkins 
Adam Everett 
Ryan Franklin 
Chris George
Shane Heams
Marcus Jensen 
Mike Kinkade 
Rick Krivda 
Doug Mientkiewicz 
Mike Neill 
Roy Oswalt 
Jon Rauch 
Anthony Sanders 
Bobby Seay 
Ben Sheets 
Brad Wilkerson 
Todd Williams 
Ernie Young 
Tim Young

References

2000
Team squads